was a Japanese cargo airline headquartered in the ARC Building in Ōta, Tokyo. It operated domestic cargo services. Its main base was Tokyo International Airport.

History
The airline was established on May 17, 2005 and application for operations was filed with the Japanese Ministry of Land, Infrastructure and Transport (MLIT) in February 2006, with permission to commence operations given in September 2006. On October 31, 2006 services commenced with flights between Tokyo International Airport and Naha Airport in Okinawa and New Kitakyushu Airport in Kyūshū. In December 2006 a second aircraft, an Airbus A300-600F was received, commencing services on April 3, 2007 between Tokyo International Airport, Kansai International Airport in Osaka and New Chitose Airport in Hokkaidō. It had 122 employees in March 2007.

Earlier in the company's life, it was headquartered in Chiyoda, Tokyo.

Galaxy Airlines was owned by Sagawa Express (90%) and Japan Airlines (10%) and had 122 employees (at March 2007).

The airline shut down in October 2008.

Destinations
As of October 2008  Galaxy served routes between New Chitose (Hokkaidō), Haneda (Tokyo), Kansai (Osaka Prefecture), New Kitakyūshū (Fukuoka) and Naha (Okinawa) airports.

Fleet 

As of October 2008  the Galaxy Airlines Company fleet included 

2 Airbus A300-600R Freighter (both being sold since halting operations in October 2008)

References

External links

 Company website
 Company website (in Japanese)

Defunct airlines of Japan
Airlines established in 2005
Airlines disestablished in 2008
Defunct cargo airlines
Airline companies based in Tokyo
Cargo airlines of Japan